Paranebaliidae is a family of crustaceans belonging to the order Leptostraca.

Genera:
 Levinebalia Walker-Smith, 2000
 Paranebalia Claus, 1880
 Saronebalia Haney & Martin, 2004

References

Leptostraca